In enzymology, a 1-acylglycerophosphocholine O-acyltransferase is an enzyme that catalyzes the chemical reaction

acyl-CoA + 1-acyl-sn-glycero-3-phosphocholine  CoA + 1,2-diacyl-sn-glycero-3-phosphocholine

Thus, the two substrates of this enzyme are acyl-CoA and 1-acyl-sn-glycero-3-phosphocholine, whereas its two products are CoA and 1,2-diacyl-sn-glycero-3-phosphocholine.

This enzyme belongs to the family of transferases, specifically those acyltransferases transferring groups other than aminoacyl groups.  The systematic name of this enzyme class is acyl-CoA:1-acyl-sn-glycero-3-phosphocholine O-acyltransferase. Other names in common use include lysolecithin acyltransferase, 1-acyl-sn-glycero-3-phosphocholine acyltransferase, acyl coenzyme A-monoacylphosphatidylcholine acyltransferase, acyl-CoA:1-acyl-glycero-3-phosphocholine transacylase, lysophosphatide acyltransferase, and lysophosphatidylcholine acyltransferase.  This enzyme participates in glycerophospholipid metabolism.

References

 
 
 
 

EC 2.3.1
Enzymes of unknown structure